Forrest Marion "Frosty" Hardacre (July 1, 1915 – August 7, 2011) was an American football coach.  He was the head football coach at McPherson College in McPherson, Kansas, serving for two seasons, from 1948 to 1949, and compiling a record of 1–16.

Head coaching record

References

External links
 

1915 births
2011 deaths
Kansas Jayhawks football players
McPherson Bulldogs football coaches
People from Smith County, Kansas